Prince Constantine Alexios of Greece and Denmark (born 29 October 1998) is a member of the non-reigning Greek royal family, the eldest son and second child of Crown Prince Pavlos and Crown Princess Marie-Chantal of Greece. He is the grandson of Constantine II and Anne-Marie of Denmark, who were the last King and Queen of Greece.

Biography 
Constantine Alexios was born on 29 October 1998 at Weill Cornell Medical Center in New York City. In traditional Greek naming practices, first sons are named for their paternal grandfathers. He is the younger brother of Princess Maria-Olympia and older brother of Prince Achileas-Andreas, Prince Odysseas-Kimon, and Prince Aristidis-Stavros.

Constantine Alexios was christened in a Greek Orthodox ceremony at St. Sophia's Cathedral, London, on 15 April 1999. His godparents are Prince Nikolaos of Greece and Denmark; Prince Dimitri of Yugoslavia; Frederik, Crown Prince of Denmark; King Felipe VI of Spain; William, Prince of Wales; Victoria, Crown Princess of Sweden; Princess Alexandra zu Fürstenberg; and Doris Robbs. Three of his godparents are prospective monarchs and one is a reigning king.

Personal life 
Constantine Alexios,  known as 'Tino' and 'Alexios', grew up in London from the age of four, and began his education at Wetherby School in London but later he attended Wellington College where he graduated in 2017. At Wellington he also received military education. In August 2017 he matriculated at Georgetown University. The decision to study in the United States was announced already a year before the graduation from Wellington College. He graduated from Georgetown University in May 2022. Constantine Alexios is also known for his artistic skills both painting and sculpturing very often sculptures inspired by Greek mythology and has more than 100,000 followers on Instagram. Besides doing art he is also known to be interested in hunting, music and photography.

Constantine Alexios has also, together with his father, been a model for Dior modeling for fashion photographer Nikolai von Bismarck for the book "The Dior Sessions", which was the first book from Dior entirely with focus on men's fashion from Dior Homme. All proceeds from the sale of the book was for the benefit of the Teenage Cancer Trust.

Titles, styles, and honours

Titles 
29 October 1998 – present: His Royal Highness Prince Constantine Alexios of Greece and Denmark

Honours

Dynastic 

 Grand Cross of the Royal Order of the Redeemer

References

External links 

 Christening of Constantine Alexios
 Prince Constantine-Alexios of Greece and Denmark

1998 births
Living people
American people of Canadian descent
American people of Danish descent
American people of Ecuadorian descent
American people of English descent
American people of German descent
American people of Greek descent
American people of Swedish descent
Georgetown University alumni
House of Glücksburg (Greece)
Members of the Church of Greece
Danish princes
Greek princes
Greek Orthodox Christians from the United States
People educated at Wellington College, Berkshire
People educated at Wetherby School